State Route 895 (SR 895) is a short state highway in White Pine County, Nevada. It is a spur route off of SR 318, serving the community of Preston near Lund. The route was designated in 1976, and has not changed significantly since.

Route description

SR 895 starts at the eastern side of Preston, and turns northwestward. As the route leaves Preston, it turns northward. The road heads across the desert for about a mile, then ends at SR 318 at a T-intersection. SR 895 is not part of the National Highway System.

History
The short route was designated in 1976, and has not changed significantly since.

Major intersections

See also

References

895
Transportation in White Pine County, Nevada